Yule Ritual is a 2001 live album by Hawkwind.

Track listing
"Electronic Intro" (Hawkwind) – 4:27
"Levitation" (Brock) – 8:47
"Spacebrock" (Brock) – 6:08
"Space Is Deep" (Brock) – 5:45
"Flying Doctor" (Calvert, Brock) – 5:04
"Warrior at the Edge of Time" (Moorcock, House, King, Powell) – 4:14
"Angels of Death" (Brock) – 6:36
"High Rise" (Calvert, House) – 5:07
"Damage of Life" (Brock) – 6:39
"Lighthouse" (Blake) – 7:54
"Sonic Attack" (Moorcock, Bainbridge, Brock, Lloyd-Langton) – 5:56
"Free Fall" (Calvert, Bainbridge) – 6:32
"Motorway City" (Brock) – 6:13
"Hurry on Sundown" (Brock) – 3:43
"Spirit of the Age" (Calvert, Brock) – 7:06
"Assassins of Allah" [aka "Hassan-i-Sabah" (Calvert, Rudolph) / "Space Is Their (Palestine)" (Brock)] – 8:58

Personnel 
Hawkwind
Ron Tree – vocals
Dave Brock – guitar, keyboards, vocals
Alan Davey – bass guitar, vocals
Richard Chadwick – drums
Simon House – violin
Harvey Bainbridge – synthesisers
Tim Blake – synthesisers, vocals
Jerry Richards – guitar, vocals
Captain Rizz – vocals on "Assassins of Allah"
Michael Moorcock – vocals on "Warrior at the Edge of Time" and "Sonic Attack"
Keith Kniveton – synthesisers
Jez Huggett – saxophone, flute on some tracks

Credits
Recorded at London Astoria, 29 December 2000

Release
Oct-2001: Voiceprint Records, HAWKVP19CD, UK 2CD

References

Hawkwind live albums
2001 live albums